Suchomasty is a municipality and village in Beroun District in the Central Bohemian Region of the Czech Republic. It has about 500 inhabitants.

Administrative parts
The village of Borek is an administrative part of Suchomasty.

History
The first written mention of Suchomasty is in a document from 1088 in which it is stated that King Vratislaus II of Bohemia gave the village of Suchomasty and two plow yards to the newly founded Vyšehrad Chapter.

Sights
Suchomasty is known for the Klonk National Nature Monument, which is globally recognized as a geologically important location due to the presence of the Global Boundary Stratotype Section and Point marking the boundary between Silurian and Devonian periods.

References

Villages in the Beroun District